Frank Alden Tobey (February 7, 1903 – December 6, 1977) was an American Army officer who served as the 10th Chief of Chaplains of the United States Army from 1958 to 1962.

References

External links
Image of General Frank A. Tobey with Rabbi Isaac Klein in Buffalo, NY, 1959

1903 births
1977 deaths
Chiefs of Chaplains of the United States Army
United States Army generals
Deputy Chiefs of Chaplains of the United States Army
Burials at Arlington National Cemetery
Recipients of the Distinguished Service Medal (US Army)
20th-century American clergy